The Puerto Rican Workers' Central (CPT) is a trade union center in Puerto Rico. It is one of the most important non-US-aligned unions in the territory.

History

In 2010, CPT led a successful picket line at a government center in the barrio of Munillas, prohibiting work from taking place.

In 2017, CPT expressed solidarity with workers at the University of Puerto Rico, who were protesting against massive budget cuts.

CPT is opposed to the PROMESA law and the austerity measures imposed by its Fiscal Control Board.

Affiliates
 Independent Authentic Union of Aqueduct and Sewerage Authority Employees (UIA AAA)
 Independent Brotherhood of Telephone Employees (HIETEL)
 Independent Union of Telephone Employees (UIET Unida)
 Others

References

Trade unions in Puerto Rico
State wide trade unions in the United States